This is a list of massacres in Yugoslavia during the 20th century.

Inter-war period (1919–41)
 Šahovići massacre
 Rugova Massacre

World War II

1946–1991
 Foibe massacres

Croatian War

The Zagreb rocket attacks is one of the many massacres in Croatia.

Bosnian War

Kosovo War

 
Yugoslavia
Massacres